Burum may refer to:

People with the surname
Stephen H. Burum (born 1939), American cinematographer

Places
Burum, Netherlands
Burum, Yemen

Other uses
Burum, a Welsh jazz sextet re-interpreting traditional folk songs, established in 2006
Burum language, Papuan language